Kelvin Hall School is a co-educational secondary school located in Kingston upon Hull in the East Riding of Yorkshire, England.

History
It opened as Kelvin Hall, Bricknell High School in 1959, and was a technical school. Kelvin Hall was operated separately to Wyke Hall (now Wyke College) and Bricknell High School, which were located on the same campus and was a secondary modern school. Kelvin Hall later took over the whole campus and became a comprehensive school. The school relocated to new buildings on the same site in 2012.

It was previously a foundation school administered by Hull City Council and the West Hull Co-operative Learning Trust. 

A new trust named Yorkshire and the Humber Co-operative Learning Trust (YHCLT) was formed on 14 September 2016, and sponsored Kelvin along with multiple other schools, taking the place of the West Hull Co-operative Learning Trust.

In November 2016, Kelvin Hall School converted to academy status, and the trust was renamed to Thrive Co-operative Learning Trust on 12 August 2021.

Academics
Kelvin Hall School offers GCSEs and BTECs as programmes of study for pupils.

Notable former pupils
Nick Barmby, footballer and manager
Sonny Bradley, footballer
Roland Gift, actor and lead singer of the group Fine Young Cannibals
Colin Thorne, Chair of Physical Geography at the University of Nottingham
Adrian Oxaal, guitarist with James and Oysterband

References

External links
Kelvin Hall School Official Website
Thrive Trust Official Website

Secondary schools in Kingston upon Hull
Educational institutions established in 1959
1959 establishments in England
Academies in Kingston upon Hull